Thomas M. Woodruff (May 3, 1804 – March 28, 1855) represented New York's 5th congressional district in the United States House of Representatives from 1845 to 1847.

Biography
Born in Newark, New Jersey, Woodruff was employed as a cabinetmaker and later engaged in the furniture business in New York City.

He was elected as a candidate of the American Party to the Twenty-ninth Congress (March 4, 1845 – March 3, 1847).

He died in New York City on March 28, 1855, and was interred in the First Presbyterian Church Cemetery in Newark, New Jersey.

References

Sources

Thomas M. Woodruff at The Political Graveyard

1804 births
1855 deaths
Politicians from Newark, New Jersey
Know-Nothing members of the United States House of Representatives from New York (state)
19th-century American politicians